Yakutovo (Yaqut) is a rural locality (a selo) in Muraptalovsky Selsoviet, Kuyurgazinsky District, Bashkortostan, Russia. The population was 343 as of 2010. There are 4 streets.

Geography 
Yakutovo is located 40 km south of Yermolayevo (the district's administrative centre) by road. Novomuraptalovo is the nearest rural locality.

References 

Rural localities in Kuyurgazinsky District